Somrai (Sumrey), also known as Sibine (Shibne), is an Afro-Asiatic language spoken in the southwestern Chadian prefectures of Tandjilé and Lai. The speakers or Somrai are not bilingual; the language is not mutually intelligible with any other, as its highest lexical similarity with another language is with Ndam (42%). Most of the speakers, who call themselves Shibne or Sibine, generally practice traditional religions, Christianity, or Islam.

References 

East Chadic languages
Languages of Chad